Carabus violaceus, sometimes called the violet ground beetle, or the rain beetle is a nocturnal species of a beetle, from the family Carabidae.

Description
The violet ground beetle is a non-shiny, black beetle that has violet or indigo edges to its smooth, oval elytra (wing cases) and thorax. Adult beetles are usually . The beetles do not fly.

Distribution
The species can be found throughout Europe, and Japan.

Ecology
The species can be found in forests, parks, and gardens. They are nocturnal. Both adults and larvae feed on slugs, snails, worms and insects (presumably weevils).

References

External links
Global Biodiversity Information Facility

violaceus
Beetles described in 1758
Beetles of Asia
Beetles of Europe
Taxa named by Carl Linnaeus